Codex Seidelianus II designated by He or 013 (in the Gregory-Aland numbering), ε 88 (von Soden), is a Greek uncial manuscript of the four Gospels, dated palaeographically to the 9th century. The manuscript is lacunose.

Description 

The codex contains 194 parchment leaves. The text is written in one column per page, and 23 lines per column. The codex contains the text of the four Gospels with major lacunae (Matt. 1:1-15:30, 25:33-26:3, Mark 1:32-2:4, 15:44-16:14, Luke 5:18-32, 6:8-22, 10:2-19, John 9:30-10:25, 18:2-18, 20:12-25).

It has breathings and accents.

Text 

The Greek text of this codex is a representative of the Byzantine text-type. Aland gave to it textual profile 1741 821/2 22 7s and placed it in Category V. It belongs to the textual family E, but according to the Claremont Profile Method it represents the textual family Kx.

History 

The codex was brought from the East by Erasmus Seidel at the beginning of the 17th century, together with Codex Seidelianus I. Maturin Veyssière de La Croze bought it 1718, in the same time as Seidelianus I.

Since 1838 the codex is located in Hamburg Universitätsbibliothek (Cod. 91). One leaf of the codex is housed at Trinity College, Cambridge (B XVII 20.21).

It was examined by Petersen, Bentley, Tregelles, Tischendorf, and Gregory.

See also 

 List of New Testament uncials
 Textual criticism

References

Further reading 

 Bruce M. Metzger, The Text of the New Testament: Its Transmission, Corruption and Restoration, 2005, Oxford University Press, p. 76.

External links 
 R. Waltz, Codex Seidelianus II He (013): at the Encyclopedia of Textual Criticism.

Greek New Testament uncials
9th-century biblical manuscripts
Manuscripts in Cambridge